Shamrock Bowl XXV was an American football game pitting the 6 time Shamrock Bowl champions, Dublin Rebels against university side, UL Vikings. The game was played on July 31, 2011, at the Morton Stadium in Santry, Dublin. The Rebels defeated the Vikings  by a score of 14-13, earning their seventh Shamrock Bowl win. Rebels safety Marcus Naylor was named the Shamrock Bowl MVP. He was the second Rebels safety ever to win the award following, Brian Carter.

This was a replay of last year's Shamrock Bowl. The UL Vikings came into the game on the back of an undefeated streak. Dublin Rebels, the reigning champions,  came into the game after winning the Central Division and losing 3 matches including one against the UL Vikings.

The event was reported by many newspapers and websites including Extratime, a popular website dealing with Irish sport. Footage of the event was later released on YouTube and on the IAFL website. Highlights of the match were also shown on NFL Sunday.

Background

Host selection
The game was originally scheduled to take place at Tallaght Stadium, however the stadium was  unavailable due to Shamrock Rovers Champions League commitments.

On June 17, it was reported that National Sports Campus Development Authourity had agreed to facilitate the silver jubilee game at Morton Stadium. The Morton Stadium was an ideal choice as it had already received an upgrade earlier in the year. Also, it had a capacity of 5,000 which gave the IAFL a chance to beat the previous attendance record.

Pre-game notes
The Rebels and The Vikings entered the game evenly. Major factors included that The Vikings had been unbeaten all season and they already defeated The Dublin Rebels, earlier in the season. Another factor was that the game was taking place in Dublin, which gave the Dublin Rebels home advantage. Also, Dublin Rebels were entering into the game as defending champions.

References

Shamrock Bowl
2011 in American football
2011 in Irish sport